The Académie nationale de chirurgie (National Academy of Surgery) was founded on 18 December 1731, under the name d’Académie royale de chirurgie by Georges Mareschal, first surgeon of Louis XV and by François La Peyronie, his successor. Dissolved during the Revolution, it was reborn on 27 August 1843, at the initiative of several surgeons (Bérard, Monod, Alphonse Robert, Michon, Guersant, Vidal, Danyau, Denonvilliers, Malgaigne, Cunasc, Chassaignac, Maisonneuve, Nelaton, Marjolin), first under the name of Société de chirurgie de Paris, and was then renamed Société nationale de chirurgie in 1875. In 1935, it took the name of Académie de chirurgie, and adopted its current name in 1997.

The president is Dominique Franco.

References 

Medical associations based in France
1731 establishments in France